This is the discography of English musician Toyah Willcox, as part of the band Toyah and as a solo artist, for which she has carried on releasing music credited as Toyah. It also includes Willcox's one-off collaborations with other artists; however for the discography of The Humans, see .

Albums

Studio albums

Live albums

Compilation albums

Box sets

Collaborative albums

Singles

Videos

Video albums

Music videos

References

External Links 
  as the band Toyah
  as Toyah Willcox
  as Toyah

Discographies of British artists
Rock music group discographies
New wave discographies